Planta is a monthly peer-reviewed scientific journal covering all areas of plant biology. It was established in 1925 and is published by Springer Science+Business Media. The editors-in-chief are Anastasios Melis (UC-Berkeley) and Dorothea Bartels (Universitat Bonn). According to the Journal Citation Reports, the journal has a 2021 impact factor of 4.540.

References

External links 
 

Biology journals
Publications established in 1925
Springer Science+Business Media academic journals
Monthly journals
English-language journals